Events from the year 1545 in India.

Events
 26 May – Islam Shah Suri succeeds Sher Shah Suri to become ruler of the Sur Empire

Births

Deaths
 22 May – Sher Shah Suri (born 1486)

See also

 Timeline of Indian history